This is a list of the National Register of Historic Places listings in Hemphill County, Texas.

This is intended to be a complete list of properties listed on the National Register of Historic Places in Hemphill County, Texas. There is one property listed on the National Register in the county.

Current listings 

|}

See also

National Register of Historic Places listings in Texas
Recorded Texas Historic Landmarks in Hemphill County

References

External links

Hemphill County, Texas
Hemphill County
Buildings and structures in Hemphill County, Texas